William Penn Charter School (commonly known as Penn Charter or simply PC) is an independent school in Philadelphia, Pennsylvania. It was founded in 1689 at the urging of William Penn as the "Public Grammar School" and chartered in 1689 to be operated by the "Overseers of the public School, founded by Charter in the town and county of Philadelphia" in Pennsylvania. It is the oldest Quaker school in the world, the oldest elementary school in Pennsylvania, and the fifth oldest elementary school in the United States following The Collegiate School ("claimed" 1628), Boston Latin School (1635), Hartford Public High School (1638), and Roxbury Latin (1645).

History
Penn Charter is among the first schools in the United States to offer education to all religions (1689), financial aid (1701), matriculation to girls (1754), and education to all races (1770). The "Charter" in the school's name does not, as might be assumed, mean that it is a modern "charter school".  Rather, it is a reference to the historic document signed by William Penn to establish the first Quaker school in America. Originally located on the east side of Fourth Street below Chestnut, the school officially consolidated in 1874 as an all-boys College-preparatory school at 12th and Market Streets. Penn Charter moved to its current forty-seven acre East Falls campus in 1925. In 1980 the school became fully co-educational by allowing girls to continue past the second grade, thus graduating the first co-ed senior class in 1992.

Traditions
While the school is not under the care of a formal monthly Meeting, in keeping with the school's Quaker heritage, the Overseers, a board of 21 trustees established by William Penn, still governs the school affairs through Quaker consensus. Jeffrey Reinhold is the current clerk of the Overseers. All students attend a weekly meeting for worship.  Faculty meetings and all-school assemblies, and some classes begin with a moment of silence.

Service-learning is integral to the school and incorporated into the pre-K to 12 curriculum. The school's Center for Public Purpose engages students in service and community-based work by addressing Philadelphia's most pressing social issues, particularly education, food insecurity, and poverty. To earn an activity credit, many Upper School students complete 40 hours of community service a year; a van carrying students leaves the campus after school every day to perform community service in various locations throughout the Philadelphia area.

Color Day, celebrated on the Friday before Memorial Day, is a tradition in which two teams sporting the school's colors, blue and yellow, compete against each other in playful contests, concluding with a 12th-grade rope pull.

The school's Senior Stairs are a central stairway that only current seniors, faculty, and alumni can use during school hours.

A Penn Charter graduate is known as an "OPC."  The honorific "OPC 1689" is bestowed rarely by the Overseers upon significant faculty and staff in recognition of their service to Old Penn Charter.

Activities
The school newspaper, "The Mirror", is the oldest secondary school student newspaper in the United States, having been published since 1777.

The Upper School Quakers Dozen is the school's select co-ed a cappella group. During the last week of classes before the winter recess, the group greets the community with holiday music on the Senior Stairs in the morning.

In the summer months, the school runs a day camp for children.

Sports
Penn Charter is a member of the Inter-Academic League (Inter-Ac), the nation's oldest high school sports league, and shares the nation's oldest continuous football rivalry with Germantown Academy, celebrated every year since 1886 during GA/PC Day. As of 2018 the game has been played 133 times, more times than the Army–Navy Game (116) and just two fewer times than the Harvard–Yale Game (132).

Campus
On the  campus, the three divisions of the school (Lower, Middle, and Upper Schools) have their own designated buildings.

Leadership
John Flagg Gummere, scion of prominent Quaker educators, was headmaster from 1941 to 1968. He was a noted Latin scholar (Ph.D., Penn) and author of several widely used textbooks. He was followed by Wilbert L. Braxton, a longtime dedicated Penn Charter faculty member and administrator. Braxton was headmaster from 1968 until 1976. He was followed by Head of School Earl J. Ball III. After 31 years as head, Ball retired in June 2007.  Darryl J. Ford, former director of the Penn Charter Middle School, was appointed as Head of School by the Overseers after a national search.  Ford is the school's first African-American head.

In popular culture
The ABC show The Goldbergs features a fictional school that the Goldberg children attend called William Penn Academy, which is based on William Penn Charter School.  The show's creator, Adam F. Goldberg, is an alumnus of William Penn Charter School, an OPC 1994.  The show features Germantown Academy as the chief rival of the school.  The show also features actual teachers and students who attended the school in the '80s and '90s.

Schooled, a spin-off of The Goldbergs also features the fictional William Penn Academy as the primary setting for the show.

Notable alumni

Penn Charter has notable alumni in the arts, sciences, government, and business, including Rubén Amaro Jr., David Sirota, Jesse Watters, Matt Ryan, Robert Picardo, Adam F. Goldberg, Leicester Bodine Holland, Richard B. Fisher, Arthur Ingersoll Meigs, Richard Lester and Vic Seixas.

References

External links 

1689 establishments in Pennsylvania
Quaker schools in Pennsylvania
Private elementary schools in Pennsylvania
Private middle schools in Pennsylvania
Private high schools in Pennsylvania
High schools in Philadelphia
East Falls, Philadelphia
Educational institutions established in the 1680s